The Saluan–Banggai languages are a group of closely related languages spoken in eastern Central Sulawesi province, Indonesia. They belong to the Celebic subgroup of the Austronesian family.

Languages
Eastern: Banggai, Balantak
Saluanic: Andio, Bobongko, Saluan, Batui

Grimes & Edwards (2021) have proposed the inclusion of Taliabo (Kadai, Padang/Samala, Mananga, Mangei/Soboyo)<ref>Charles Grimes & Owen Edwards (in process) Wallacean subgroups: unravelling the prehistory and classification of the Austronesian languages of eastern Indonesia and Timor-Leste. Summary presentation at the 15th International Conference on Austronesian Linguistics</ref> and the Saluan–Banggai languages in a common branch of Celebic, which they call Saluan–Taliabu.

References

External links
"Saluan-Banggai" at Ethnologue'' (23rd ed, 2020).

 
Central Sulawesi
Celebic languages